Smitham Chimney is a chimney which was used for lead mining just outside the village of East Harptree, in the parish of Priddy, Somerset, England. It is a Grade II listed building.

The circular chimney has two types of red brick in its upper portion. There is a narrow opening at the base of the chimney.

It was built by the 'East Harptree Lead Works Co Ltd' in 1867, and by 1870 was producing 1,000 tons per annum. The company was largely unsuccessful and the industry only lasted for a few years. The chimney was threatened to be demolished in 1973, by the Somerset County Council but was protected from demolition. Because of the pollution the site supports a population of lead moss (Ditrichum plumbicola).

References

Buildings and structures in Mendip District
Grade II listed buildings in Bath and North East Somerset
Chimneys in the United Kingdom
Buildings and structures completed in 1867
Grade II listed industrial buildings